Phosphoinositide 3-kinase regulatory subunit 4, also known as PI3-kinase regulatory subunit 4 or PI3-kinase p150 subunit or phosphoinositide 3-kinase adaptor protein, or VPS15 is an enzyme that in humans is encoded by the PIK3R4 gene.

References

Further reading

EC 2.7.11